"At My Best" is a song by American rapper Machine Gun Kelly, featuring American singer Hailee Steinfeld. It was released on March 17, 2017 via Bad Boy and Interscope. It is Machine Gun Kelly's second single to enter Billboard Hot 100 after his 2016 collaboration with Camila Cabello, "Bad Things".

Background
"This song's for anybody that feels like I did, never the cool kid," MGK said. "This song's for anybody who fought their way through, always remained true. This song's for anybody, the ones that's trying to get it the ones that dream it and live it."

Music video
The music video for the song was released on April 21, 2017, and features MGK and Hailee Steinfeld. The video shows them "struggling to find their place in the world, trying to feel comfortable with who they are".

Critical reception
Lauren Tom of Billboard magazine said that the song has a "strong string of vocals, plenty of guitar riffs and an exciting electric sound MGK has used in the past with his other songs", "sends a powerful message through its lyrics, telling listeners to 'keep going' and to fight for your dream, always staying true to yourself."

In another article, she said that the music video "bridges together the track's compelling and evocative lyrics that push you to believe in yourself. The emotional ending focuses on the internal struggles we have with ourselves."

Track listing

Charts

Certifications

Release history

References

Machine Gun Kelly (musician) songs
Hailee Steinfeld songs
Bad Boy Records singles
2017 singles
2017 songs
Songs written by Machine Gun Kelly (musician)
Songs written by Edvard Forre Erfjord
Songs written by Benny Blanco
Songs written by Henrik Barman Michelsen
Songs written by Happy Perez